Eurovision 2008 could refer to:

 Eurovision Dance Contest 2008, the second Eurovision Dance Contest that was held in September 2008
 Eurovision Song Contest 2008, the fifty-third Eurovision Song Contest that was held in May 2008
 Junior Eurovision Song Contest 2008, the sixth Junior Eurovision Song Contest that was held in November 2008